1751 Herget, provisional designation , is a stony Gefionian asteroid from the central region of the asteroid belt, approximately 11 kilometers in diameter.

It was discovered on 27 July 1955, by IUs Indiana Asteroid Program at Goethe Link Observatory near Brooklyn, Indiana, United States. The asteroid was named after American astronomer Paul Herget.

Classification and orbit 

Herget is a member of the large Gefion family of asteroids. It orbits the Sun in the central main-belt at a distance of 2.3–3.3 AU once every 4 years and 8 months (1,701 days; semi-major axis of 2.79 AU). Its orbit has an eccentricity of 0.18 and an inclination of 8° with respect to the ecliptic. As no precoveries were taken, and no prior identifications were made, the body's observation arc begins with its official discovery observation at Goethe Link in 1955.

Physical characteristics 

In the SMASS classification, Herget has been characterized as a common S-type asteroid, which agrees with the overall spectral type of the Gefion family.

Diameter and albedo 

According to the survey carried out by NASA's Wide-field Infrared Survey Explorer with its subsequent NEOWISE mission, Herget measures 10.93 kilometers in diameter, and its surface has an albedo of 0.195, while the Collaborative Asteroid Lightcurve Link assumes a standard albedo for carbonaceous asteroids of 0.057 and calculates a diameter of 23.21 kilometers with an absolute magnitude of 11.9, as the lower the body's albedo (reflectivity), the larger its diameter.

Rotation period 

In November 2016, two rotational lightcurves of Herget were obtained from photometric observations by Italian astronomers Lorenzo Franco and Alessandro Marchini, as well as by French amateur astronomer René Roy. Lightcurve analysis gave a rotation period of 3.937 and 3.9397 hours with a brightness amplitude of 0.30 and 0.31 magnitude, respectively.

Naming 

This minor planet was named in honor of American astronomer Paul Herget (1908–1981), who was director of the Cincinnati Observatory and distinguished service professor in the University of Cincinnati.

Herget was also founder of the Minor Planet Center (MPC) in 1947, pioneer in the application of high speed computers to astronomical problems, member of the U.S. National Academy of Sciences, and past president of IAU's Commission 20 (Positions & Motions of Minor Planets, Comets & Satellites). The official  was published by the MPC on 20 February 1971.

References

External links 
 Asteroid Lightcurve Database (LCDB), query form (info )
 Dictionary of Minor Planet Names, Google books
 Asteroids and comets rotation curves, CdR – Observatoire de Genève, Raoul Behrend
 Discovery Circumstances: Numbered Minor Planets (1)-(5000) – Minor Planet Center
 
 

001751
001751
Named minor planets
001751
19550727